Lelio Landi (died 24 November 1610) was an Italian Roman Catholic prelate who served as Bishop of Nardò (1596–1610).

Biography
On 9 September 1596, Lelio Landi was appointed during the papacy of Pope Clement VIII as Bishop of Nardò. He served as Bishop of Nardò until his death on 24 November 1610.

References

External links and additional sources
 (for Chronology of Bishops) 
(for Chronology of Bishops) 

16th-century Italian Roman Catholic bishops
17th-century Italian Roman Catholic bishops
1610 deaths
Bishops appointed by Pope Clement VIII